Johan de Bruyn  (born 12 October 1948) is a former South African rugby union player.

Playing career
De Bruyn played his provincial rugby for the Free State. In 1974 he was selected at lock for the Springboks, for the third test against the touring Lions team of Willie John McBride at the Boet Erasmus Stadium in Port Elizabeth. De Bruyn then toured with the Springboks to France at the end of 1974. He did not play any test matches during the French tour but played three tour matches.

Test history

See also
List of South Africa national rugby union players – Springbok no.  475
99 call

References

1948 births
Living people
South African rugby union players
South Africa international rugby union players
Free State Cheetahs players
People from Greater Taung Local Municipality
Rugby union players from North West (South African province)
Rugby union locks